Arthur Newnham (17 January 1861 – 29 December 1941) was an English cricketer. He played for Gloucestershire between 1887 and 1899.

References

1861 births
1941 deaths
English cricketers
Gloucestershire cricketers
People from Dharwad
Europeans cricketers
Mumbai cricketers
Gentlemen cricketers
Gentlemen of England cricketers